Creedon is a surname. Notable people with the surname include: 

Cónal Creedon, Irish writer
Dan Creedon (1868-1942), New Zealand middleweight boxer 
Dave Creedon (1919-2007), Irish hurler and footballer 
Eileen Creedon (born 1957), Irish judge
John Creedon (born 1958), Irish broadcaster
John J. Creedon (1924–2020), American business executive
Johnny Creedon (born 1932), Irish footballer
Michael Creedon (born 1960), Irish footballer
Peter Creedon, Irish football manager
Tom Creedon (1954-1983), Irish footballer